Ellen Alfsen (born 31 May 1965) is a Norwegian politician for the Christian Democratic Party.

She served as a deputy representative to the Norwegian Parliament from Østfold during the terms 2001–2005 and 2005–2009.

She hails from Moss.

References

1965 births
Living people
Deputy members of the Storting
Christian Democratic Party (Norway) politicians
Østfold politicians
People from Moss, Norway
21st-century Norwegian women politicians
21st-century Norwegian politicians
Women members of the Storting